Great North Road may refer to:

Roads
 Great North Road (Great Britain), a historical coaching route partly used by the A1 road in the United Kingdom
 Great North Road (Ancestral Puebloans), a road used by the Ancestral Puebloans of the American Southwest, part of the Chacoan road system
 Great North Road, Gibraltar, a lorry sized tunnel
 Great North Road (New South Wales), a historical road in Australia leading from Sydney to the Hunter Valley
 Great North Road (Mount Manning to Wollombi Section)
 Great North Road, Auckland, a road in Auckland
 Great North Road, Zambia, a road running north from Lusaka
 Great North Road (Ontario), a 19th-century road from Parry Sound to Nipissing, see Magnetawan
 Cape to Cairo Road, an historically planned route through Africa
 Cariboo Road, an historical route in British Columbia, Canada
 New Zealand State Highway 1, a road near Kamo in New Zealand

Other
Great North Road (book), a science fiction novel by Peter F Hamilton, 2012

See also
 North Road (disambiguation)